Fried dace with salted black beans is a canned food of Chinese origin. Cirrhinus molitorella (dace) is a fish from the Pearl River in China ‘Dace’ is a trade name of Cirrhinus molitorella while ‘salted black beans’ refer to fermented black soybeans known as “dau si” (豆豉) in Cantonese. Fried dace with salted black beans is made by combining dace with salted black beans and preserving it in oil afterwards.

History
Fried dace with salted black beans originated in Guangzhou in China. Before the industrialisation of China began in the 1950s, many Chinese from the Pearl River Delta region needed to go to Southeast Asia for work. They would fry the dace, preserve it with salted black beans and bring it with them because they were not used to eating foreign food. This tradition gradually transformed into a canned food business. The first canned fried dace with salted black beans was produced by Guangzhou Guangmaoxiang Canned Food Factory in China in 1893. This factory was evolved from “广奇香罐头厂” (the Guang Qi Xiang Guan Tou Factory), which was registered in 1912 in Hong Kong.

Around the 1960s, people in Hong Kong did not have a good living environment and family circumstances. They had low income and low purchasing power. Due to its low price, long shelf life, and its strong taste, which allows it to be served with rice alone, canned fried dace with salted black beans became a very common food for meals. Sometimes, it would be cooked at home, which added warmth and nostalgic value to this dish. Fried dace with salted black beans was the collective memory for many people in Hong Kong.

People consume less food like fried dace with salted black beans nowadays. There are some reasons behind this. Firstly, after the economic takeoff in 1970s, the economic ability and social status of people in Hong Kong had improved. The rise in income and purchasing power had exposed them to more choice of food. Secondly, people in Hong Kong started to have higher education level. They would then take nutritional values of food into consideration when deciding what to eat. As research show that canned food lacks nutritional value because of the artificial processing, people consume less fried dace with salted black beans. Moreover, they would store a few cans at home for rainy days. On the other hand, fried dace with salted black beans became widely commercialized. It is mass-produced by different food companies and sold as a product on the shelf in supermarkets. It is now usually purchased in cans instead of being cooked at home because of efficiency and convenience.

Ingredients and taste
There are seven essential ingredients in the canned product; fresh dace, salted black beans, vegetable oil, sugar, soybean sauce, salt and spices. It is very salty, with a slight burnt smoky taste from the black beans. The dace, preserved in vegetable oil, has a chewy texture with soft, edible, bones inside. It tastes well-seasoned with black beans and flavored with savory spices.

Preparation and serving
Fried dace with salted black beans can be eaten cold straight out of the can or heated before being served. Other classic ways are eating with stir fried green vegetables, noodles or plain white rice.

Marketing

Style of packaging

The packaging of canned fried dace with salted black beans is an oval-shaped tin can.

Target customers
Fried dace with salted black beans has always been popular among the lower and middle income group. In the 1990s, low income households had to limit their expenditure on food. They could afford buying fried dace with salted black beans. Furthermore, the middle income group would also use it during emergencies (e.g. when strong typhoon signals are in force or during tropical rainstorm which prevent people from going out to eat). Thus, fried dace with salted black beans has been a common dish among lower and middle class before and is still considered as one occasionally. Even though people can afford to buy more nutritious food instead of menial canned foods after the economic boom in 1970s, people from different financial background will also consume this kind of canned food due to its convenience and cheap prices.

Health hazards and contamination 
In 2005, the Hong Kong Food and Environmental Hygiene Department tested 26 samples of food, in which some of the samples of the canned fried dace with salted black beans were tested positive for malachite green, a carcinogenic chemical. Trace quantities of malachite green were found again in 2015, 2016, 2017 and 2019, though a government spokesman assured consumers that the levels were unlikely to be harmful under normal circumstances. The United States Food and Drug Administration has detected malachite green intermittently in shipments of canned dace imported from China since 2006, and in 2007 instituted a precautionary halt to imports, though it did not consider the problem significant enough to issue a recall.

References

External links 

 

Canned food
Cantonese cuisine